Alfred Aguilar (born 1933), also called Sa Wa Pin, is a Pueblo-American potter, ceramicist, and painter from the San Ildefonso Pueblo tribe. He is known for his coil-built pottery that is carved or painted, his buffalo figurines, and his clay nacimientos. He has sold his work under the Aguilar Indian Arts moniker in Santa Fe, New Mexico.

Aguilar is the son of artists José Angela Aguilar and Rosalie Simbola, both potters. His brother José Vicente Aguilar was a painter as well.

References 

20th-century American painters
20th-century indigenous painters of the Americas
Native American painters
Pueblo artists
Painters from New Mexico
1933 births
Living people
20th-century Native Americans
21st-century Native Americans